Balkan is a newspaper published in Balkanabat, Turkmenistan. The newspaper is published three times per week (Tuesday, Thursday and Sunday). Electronic PDF copies of it may be downloaded free of charge. The area of distribution covers the territory of Balkan Region.

The newspaper is an official newspaper of the Administration of the Balkan Region. The newspaper publishes the official decrees, statements and documents of regional bodies.

Readership of the newspaper includes: authorities (regional, city, district, rural), employees of government agencies, top-managers of regional enterprise, customer officers, pensioners, housewives and students.

Covered aspects: politics, economics, culture, oil and gas sector, agricultural sector, society, regional legislative documents, tenders of the government and private companies. The newspaper takes one of the leading positions among regional socio-political subscription newspapers.

References

External links
 Online newspaper

Newspaper
Newspapers published in Turkmenistan